The Bullet Mark is a 1928 American silent Western film directed by Stuart Paton and starring Jack Donovan, Gladys McConnell and Joseph W. Girard.

Cast
 Jack Donovan 
 Gladys McConnell
 Joseph W. Girard
 Albert J. Smith
 Lincoln Plumer
 Margaret Gray

References

External links
 

1928 films
1928 Western (genre) films
Films directed by Stuart Paton
American black-and-white films
Pathé Exchange films
Silent American Western (genre) films
1920s English-language films
1920s American films